Vicirionessa is a genus of spiders in the family Salticidae.

Species
, the World Spider Catalog accepted the following extant species:

Vicirionessa albocincta (Thorell, 1899) – Cameroon, Gabon
Vicirionessa besanconi (Berland & Millot, 1941) – Guinea, Nigeria
Vicirionessa chabanaudi (Fage, 1923) – West Africa
Vicirionessa equestris (Simon, 1903) – Ivory Coast, Gabon
Vicirionessa fuscimana (Simon, 1903) – Sierra Leone, Ivory Coast, Nigeria, Cameroon, Equatorial Guinea
Vicirionessa mustela (Simon, 1902) – East, Southern Africa
Vicirionessa niveimana (Simon, 1902) – Sierra Leone, Ivory Coast, Nigeria, Equatorial Guinea, Gabon
Vicirionessa occidentalis (Wesołowska & Russell-Smith, 2011) – Nigeria
Vicirionessa peckhamorum (Lessert, 1927) (type species) – Guinea, Nigeria, Congo
Vicirionessa prenanti (Berland & Millot, 1941) – Ivory Coast
Vicirionessa signata (Dawidowicz & Wesołowska, 2016) – Ivory Coast, Kenya
Vicirionessa tergina (Simon, 1903) – Equatorial Guinea

References

Salticidae
Araneomorphae genera